The 1990 Motorcraft Formula Ford Driver to Europe Series was an Australian motor racing competition open to Formula Ford cars.
It was the 21st Australian national series for Formula Fords.

The series was won by Russell Ingall driving a Van Diemen RF90.

Schedule
The series was contested over seven rounds with one race per round.

Points system
Series points were awarded on a 20-15-12-10-8-6-4-3-2-1 basis for the first ten positions at each round.

Series standings

Notes & references

Motorcraft Formula Ford
Australian Formula Ford Series